Three Palms (Три Пальмы) is one of the most famous poetic works of the  Russian poet Mikhail Lermontov. The poem was created in 1839. It was published for the first time in the literary magazine Domestic notes 1839, volume V, #8, section III, p. 168-170. The poem appeared in the Collected works of M. Lermontov published by Elias Glazunov and Co. in 1840. Lermontov composed the poem in amphibrach tetrameter, the same meter and strophe used by Alexander Pushkin in his Imitation of the Koran, part IX, "And a weary traveler murmured to God..."

References 

"Lermontov, Mikhail Yurievich". az.lib.ru. Retrieved 2012-12-01.
"M.Yu.Lermontov. His Life and Works". Retrieved 2012-12-01.
Works by M.Y.Lermontov in 4 volumes. Khudozhestvennaya Literatura Publishers. Moscow, 1959.
"Biography.The Works by M.Y.Lermontov in 10 volumes. Moscow, Voskresenye Publishers". www.krugosvet.ru // Voskresenye Publishers. Retrieved 2013-11-01.
Three Palms by Mikhail Lermontov, Шарафутдинов Эмиль
Three Palms by Mikhail Lermontov
Published for the first time in the literary magazine "Domestic Notes", 1839, volume V, # 8, section III, p. 168—170

External links 

 Online Lermontov Shrine (in Russian)

Russian poems